Willy Zingg (who died in 1968) was a Swiss footballer who played for FC Basel. Zingg played as midfielder. 

Zingg joined Basel's first team during their 1944–45 season under team manager Max Barras. After playing only in test games in his first season, Zingg played his domestic league debut for the club in the home game at the Landhof on 23 September 1945 as Basel won 2–0 against Brühl St. Gallen.

Zingg played for Basel during six seasons. He played a total of 13 games for Basel without scoring a goal. Six of these games were in the Nationalliga, one in the Swiss Cup and six were friendly games.

References

Sources
 Rotblau: Jahrbuch Saison 2017/2018. Publisher: FC Basel Marketing AG. 
 Die ersten 125 Jahre. Publisher: Josef Zindel im Friedrich Reinhardt Verlag, Basel. 
 Verein "Basler Fussballarchiv" Homepage
(NB: Despite all efforts, the editors of these books and the authors in "Basler Fussballarchiv" have failed to be able to identify all the players, their date and place of birth or date and place of death, who played in the games during the early years of FC Basel)

FC Basel players
Swiss men's footballers
Association football midfielders
1968 deaths